The 1970 South Carolina gubernatorial election was held on November 3, 1970 to select the governor of the state of South Carolina. John C. West, the Democratic nominee, won a close general election against Albert Watson, the Republican congressman from the 2nd congressional district.

The New York Times credited West's victory to his success among Black voters, "whites who were moderate on racial issues", and segments of the white working-class who supported George Wallace's 1968 presidential campaign but were disappointed with the state of the economy.

Central to the campaign was the issue of school integration: Watson ran a segregationist campaign and pledged to "stand up" to federal judicial orders to desegregate schools.

Primaries
Both John Carl West and Albert Watson faced no opposition in their party's primaries which allowed both candidates to concentrate solely on the general election.

General election
Watson's campaign was supported by President Richard Nixon and Senator Strom Thurmond. Watson's anti-integration campaign rhetoric is considered to have contributed to a white supremacist riot that targeted Black schoolchildren. Watson would defend the rioters, stating that "you can expect that to happen when you have frustrated people … People get restless and then things occur.”

The general election was held on November 3, 1970 and West was elected as the next governor of South Carolina. Turnout was even higher than the previous gubernatorial election because of the recent enfranchisement of Black voters and the controversial candidacy of Albert Watson.

 
 
 

|-
| 
| colspan=5 |Democratic hold
|-

See also
Governor of South Carolina
List of governors of South Carolina
South Carolina gubernatorial elections

References

External links
SCIway Biography of Governor John Carl West

1970
1970 United States gubernatorial elections
Gubernatorial
November 1970 events in the United States